Swing Kids were a post-hardcore band from San Diego, California, during the mid-1990s. They were closely involved with and influenced by the forerunners of the San Diego hardcore punk scene of the 1990s.

History 
Swing Kids formed in the mid-1990s, inspired by jazz and swing era ethics. The band was short lived, documenting their entire existence in a handful of songs over a couple of years.

Swing Kids released a self-titled 7" EP which features four original tracks as well as a harsh version of Joy Division’s "Warsaw". From that EP, the song "Blue Note" was listed by Vulture.com as number 83 of the 100 greatest emo songs. Soon after the band released their EP they followed up with a split 10" EP with Spanakorzo, which shared band member John Brady.

After a few short tours and a jaunt over to Europe, the band called it quits due to drummer Jose Palafox relocating to the Bay Area. Swing Kids managed to track one last song, "El Camino Car Crash" which is the additional track on the digital follow up of the band's entire collection, simply titled Discography. Over the years, this nine-song collection would become a staple for the Three One G community.

The band did their few last shows recruiting Jimmy Lavalle to play second guitar.

Guitarist and founding member of Swing Kids and Unbroken Eric Allen killed himself in 1998. The remaining members had the opportunity to play two benefit shows in Southern California raising thousands of dollars for charity. The shows or "funerals", as the band members looked at it, displayed that the bands spirit will live on, and showcased the evolution of the remaining members musicianship.

The documentation of these shows was a self-titled 7" single featuring an updated version of "Situation on Mars" as well as a new track titled, "Fake Teeth".

Swing Kids played two reunion shows, both with Unbroken: a mostly secret show on May 8, 2009, at the Ché Cafe at UCSD in San Diego, CA and on May 9, 2009, at the Glass House in Pomona, CA. The Pomona show was a benefit for selected charities, and tickets were sold out very shortly after going on sale, despite the $25 price. According to fans, the shows ranged from "really, really, good" to "amazing, totally unbelievable." Eric Allen's mom came out right before the last Unbroken song at the Glasshouse show and thanked everyone briefly.

In 2011, Justin Pearson, Jose Palafox, Jimmy LaVelle and John Brady, accompanied by Nathan Joyner, briefly reunited under the name Blue Note, for a short tour of Europe.

Legacy 
Swing Kids carried the San Diego "art hardcore" movement past the initial wave of Gravity Records bands and through to the late 1990s, releasing a 7" EP and split 10" EP along the way.  Despite their importance in a relatively small scene, Swing Kids' impact both during their tenure and after their 1997 breakup was global, thanks to many independent Zines and a US/European tour.  The sound they pioneered inspired bands such as the Plot to Blow Up the Eiffel Tower, Refused, Orchid, Jeromes Dream and many others.

Swing Kids are also credited with the unintentional creation of the fad "Spock Rock" during the mid-1990s, largely due to many of their fans emulating Pearson's fashion sense and hair style, which itself was significantly influenced by Ian Svenonius and his band, the Nation of Ulysses. The name comes from Leonard Nimoy's character from the Star Trek television series and films, and more specifically his haircut. The band disliked the term "Spock rock".

Jose Palafox went on to play in bands such as Tit Wrench, Bread and Circuits, Yaphet Kotto, and Baader Brains. Bassist John Brady went on to play in Chicago's Sweep the Leg Johnny. Vocalist Justin Pearson went on to play in acts such as the Locust, Retox, All Leather, Some Girls, Holy Molar, Crimson Curse, Head Wound City, and Ground Unicorn Horn.

Members 
Final line-up
 Justin Pearson – lead vocals (1994–1997, 2009)
 Eric Allen – guitar (1994–1997, died 1998)
 John Brady – bass (1994–1997, 2009)
 Jose Palafox – drums (1994–1997, 2009)
 Jimmy LaValle – guitar (1997, 2009)
Former members
 Michelle Maskovich – bass (1994)

Touring members
 Nathan Joyner – guitar (2011)

Discography
Compilation albums

Singles and EPs

Other appearances

References

External links
 Swing Kids homepage from their label website Three One G
 Swing Kids Myspace

American post-hardcore musical groups
Hardcore punk groups from California
Musical groups from San Diego